Samuel G. Smith Farm is a historic home and farm located in Center Township, Wayne County, Indiana. The farmhouse was built in 1888, and is a two-story, Italianate style brick dwelling with Queen Anne style design elements. Also on the property are the contributing log house (c. 1820), carriage house, barn, corn crib, chicken house, and ice house.

It was added to the National Register of Historic Places in 1983.

References

Farms on the National Register of Historic Places in Indiana
Italianate architecture in Indiana
Queen Anne architecture in Indiana
Houses completed in 1888
Buildings and structures in Wayne County, Indiana
National Register of Historic Places in Wayne County, Indiana